Lawrence James Monroe (born June 20, 1956) is an American professional baseball pitcher, who played in Major League Baseball (MLB) for the Chicago White Sox in 1976.

Biography
Monroe was chosen by the Sox in the first round of the 1974 amateur draft with the eighth overall selection. After going 11-14 with a 2.91 ERA for the Knoxville Sox in 1976, he earned a late-season call-up to Chicago. He made his big league debut on August 23 against the Detroit Tigers, throwing two scoreless, hitless innings of relief. He earned his only decision in the majors on September 30. He started that day's game against the California Angels, going 5 innings, giving up 6 hits and 4 runs (3 earned), and walking 2 to take the loss. Returning to Knoxville in 1977, he continued to play through 1979.

After his playing days, Monroe worked for the White Sox in various capacities. When Adrian Garrett replaced Vern Law as manager of the Denver Zephyrs in 1984, Monroe was brought in to become pitching coach. He was vice president of scouting and minor league operations from 1990 to 1994 and was vice president of free agent and major league scouting from that time until 2000. Monroe was an integral part of the advanced scouting team, which aided the Chicago White Sox in winning the 2005 World Series. More recently, he was an advisor to the baseball department through 2020.

Currently Monroe runs the personal pitching training business, Pitcher Potential, geared to young men looking to improve their individual talents.

Monroe is the author of Best-Kept Secrets of Major League Pitching.  Monroe's son, Grant Monroe, was drafted by the Chicago White Sox in the 38th round of the 2007 amateur draft and again in the 46th round of the 2009 amateur draft.

References

External links

1956 births
Living people
Major League Baseball pitchers
Chicago White Sox players
Chicago White Sox scouts
Baseball players from Detroit
Amarillo Gold Sox players
Appleton Foxes players
Gulf Coast White Sox players
Knoxville Sox players
Minor league baseball coaches
Baseball coaches from Michigan